Ice climbing is the activity of ascending inclined ice formations. Usually, ice climbing refers to roped and protected climbing of features such as icefalls, frozen waterfalls, and cliffs and rock slabs covered with ice refrozen from flows of water.

For the purposes of climbing, ice can be broadly divided into two spheres, alpine ice and water ice. Alpine ice is found in a mountain environment, usually requires an approach to reach, and is often climbed in an attempt to summit a mountain. Water ice is usually found on a cliff or other outcropping beneath water flows. Alpine ice is frozen precipitation whereas water ice is a frozen liquid flow of water.  Most alpine ice is generally one component of a longer route and often less technical, having more in common with standard glacier travel, while water ice is selected largely for its technical challenge. Technical grade is, however, independent of ice type and both types of ice vary greatly in consistency according to weather conditions. Ice can be soft, hard, brittle or tough.

Mixed climbing is ascent involving both ice climbing and rock climbing, or at least stretches of exposed rocky terrain encountered while climbing ice, which may be dealt with using suitable techniques and the gear at hand.

Techniques 

Shallow and moderate stretches of ice such as those found in glacial travel and even steep pitches incidental to reaching a summit fall under the general sport of mountaineering.

For technical ice climbing, and ice climbing as a sport, double plastic mountaineering boots or their stiff leather equivalent are essential.  These must be crampon compatible and stiff enough to support the climber and maintain ankle support. Vertical ice climbing is done with rigid "step-in" crampons and ice tools (specialized scaled-down ice axes).  Climbers swing the picks of their tools to bed them in the ice, then kick the front points of their crampons into the ice to securely set them. This technique, leading with the picks and following with the legs, which bear most of the weight of the ascent, is known as front pointing.  Embedment of either picks or front points of as little as 1/4 of an inch in sound ice can be sufficient to provide secure holds. If a climber is leading, they will place protection in the form of ice screws as they go (see climbing system).

Some important techniques and practices shared in common in rock climbing include knowledge of rope systems, tying in, belaying, leading, abseiling, and lowering. Beginners should learn these techniques before attempting to ice climb. It is highly recommended that one acquire knowledge from experts and experienced ice climbers.

Rope systems

There are three primary rope systems used in ice climbing: single rope, double rope and twin rope. The single rope system, which is suited for straight climbing routes, is the most commonly used rock climbing system in the world. Also often used in climbing is the double rope system which is a more flexible system than the single rope system. Lastly, the twin rope system, which uses two twin ropes in a single rope system, is used for longer multi-pitch routes. Double and twin rope technique is used more frequently in ice climbing because these systems are more redundant, an important consideration given the number of sharp edges in both the gear and environment. Impact force on ice is an issue, with double ropes gaining popularity over twins.

Tying in
Tying in entails attaching the rope to the climbing harness. This technique is a must particularly when leading a climb or belaying. A commonly used tie-in knot is the Figure-of-eight follow through, but the bowline and Thumb (stopper) knot is often preferred, since it is easier to untie when frozen.

Belaying
In this climbing technique, either running belays or fixed belays are used. A running belay on ice is similar to a running belay on rock as well as snow. The leader of the climb puts protection and clips the rope through it. The next climber removes and stows the protection, known as "cleaning". There should be at least two points of protection between the leader and the next climber. Fixed belays, on the other hand, require a belayer, belay anchor, and points of protection. A belay anchor is attached to a cliff in supporting a belay or toprope.

Leading
Leading an ice climb involves placing specialized protection for the safety of the leader and anyone else on the rope.  This characteristically includes the placement of ice screws and construction of belay anchors as required during any given pitch.  A "second" belays the leader, who in turn belays them as they follow up.  As they do, they remove protection placed below the belay anchor.  The leader then resumes leading the climb, placing new protection as they go, with the second once again belaying them.

Abseiling
Abseiling (also called rappelling) is a means of rapid controlled descent which uses a securely fixed rope. Abseiling allows a climber to control his or her own rate of descent, whereas lowering (discussed below) is controlled by someone else. Abseiling is used to descend after a climb, when trying out new climbing routes, and when a climb can only be accessed from the top. Caution and careful execution are key when abseiling, as ropes or gear may jam and ropes be severed by sharp edges. A fireman's belay or auto block may be used for extra protection while abseiling.

Lowering
Lowering involves a climber's descent being controlled by another climber handling the working end of the rope.  The climber to be lowered is securely tied in, then a belayer either above or below them pays out rope while they descend.

Lowering is used to safely control the descent of injured climbers, when urgency requires speed and lowering one or more in a party, particularly the inexperienced, is both faster and safer than them controlling their own descents, and, when appropriate, mere convenience among capable climbers.

Competition 

The International Climbing and Mountaineering Federation (UIAA) organizes an annual Ice Climbing World Cup and bi-annual Ice Climbing World Championships.

Climbers can compete in the categories Lead and Speed.

Climbing protection 

The most common form of protection in ice climbing is the ice screw. It is a hollow metal threaded tube, typically steel, with cutting teeth on its base and a hanger eye on the opposite end. It is screwed into the ice and can provide very strong protection in solid conditions, with its hold dependent both on the angle and quality of its placement and soundness of the ice.

Ice itself is also used as protection. The two most common techniques for doing so are the V-Thread (also known as the "Abalakov anchor", named after the Russian climber who popularised the approach) and the ice bollard.  In a V-thread two intersecting tunnels are bored into the ice to form a "V" shaped tunnel. A nylon webbing sling or cordelette is then threaded through the V and tied in a loop.  The rope is passed through the sling, which remains left behind after use.

An ice bollard involves chipping ice away to create a teardrop shaped anchor.  A sling is placed around it, and the rope through the sling, which again is left behind. When ice conditions permit the sling may be dispensed with.

Useful natural formations, ice hooks, and ice pitons are also used as protection anchors by ice climbers.

Grades

Waterfall ice grading

Ice grading is not merely subjective but, given the variability of ice, weather, and route usage, cannot reflect the difficulty of a given route in all conditions. In general, routes become easier the more they are climbed. This is due to the early or ongoing cleaning of chandeliered ice and the creation of "hooks" - convenient pockets formed by previous climbers' picks - which reduce the effort expended in cleaning routes and tool placement.  Routes with high-flow seeps also tend to become easier as the season progresses, due to the increase in the volume of ice. Low-flow seeps, however (e.g. French Reality, Banff; Moonlight/Snowline, Kananaskis), often from early in the season (September–November) when the flow is good from the latent summer heat, and then slow down or even stop with the deepening winter frost; subsequent ablation (and destruction by climbing) of the ice often makes for thinner and brittler ice with time.

Grading in the Canadian Rockies, especially recently, focuses on the steepness of a pitch rather than the more subjective measures of difficulty (which include such considerations as protectability, exposure, commitment required, etc.) and "technical difficulty" (e.g. chandeliers, bonding, etc.) during the first ascent. This has resulted in the downgrading of several high-rated routes, e.g. Sea of Vapours, which were in poor conditions during the first ascents.  A common use of the "+" designation is to indicate a higher level of technicality than is typical for the grade (e.g. chandeliers, poor bonding, etc.) that is consistent from year to year (i.e. Wicked Wanda, WI4+, has vicious mushrooms on an otherwise low-angled route, which persist from year to year).

Canadian Rockies WI grading does not regard pitch length - I.e. a 4-pitch WI5 is not rated WI6 just because it's long; its rating reflects the difficulty of its greatest challenge(s).

WI2 – low-angled (60-degree consistent ice), with good technique, can be easily climbed with one ice axe. Grades beyond this generally require the use of two ice tools.

WI3 – generally sustained in the 60–70 degree range with occasional near-vertical steps up to 4 metres (Cascade Waterfall, Banff; This House of Sky, Ghost River)

WI4 – near-vertical steps of up to 10 metres, generally sustained climbing requiring placing protection screws from strenuous stances (Professor's Falls, Banff; Weeping Wall Left, Icefields Parkway; Silk Tassle, Yoho; Moonlight & Snowline, Kananaskis)

WI4+ – highly technical WI4. (Wicked Wanda, Ghost River)

WI5 – near-vertical or vertical steps of up to 20 metres, sustained climbing requiring placing multiple protection screws from strenuous stances with very few good rests (Carlsberg Column, Field; The Sorcerer, Ghost River; Bourgeau Left Hand, Banff)

WI5+ – highly technical WI5 (Oh le Tabernac, Icefield Parkway; Hydrophobia, Ghost River; Sacre Bleu, Banff; Stairway to Heaven, Provo Canyon)

WI6 – vertical climbing for the entire pitch (e.g. 30–60 metres) with no rests. Requires excellent technique and/or a high level of fitness (The Terminator, Banff; Nemesis, Kootenay Park; Whiteman Falls, Kananaskis Country; Riptide, Banff)

WI6+ – vertical or overhanging with no rests, and highly technical WI6 (Fosslimonster, Norway; French Maid, Yoho; French Reality, Kootenay Park)

WI7 – sustained and overhanging with no rests. Rare; widely accepted testpiece examples of this grade do not exist in the Canadian Rockies (e.g. Sea of Vapours, Banff; Riptide, Icefield Parkway, Banff)

Modern ice-climbers have established even more severe grades for waterfall ice climbs that are largely severely overhanging, notable milestones being:

WI10 – Spray On (first W10 climbed by Tim Emmett and Will Gadd in 2010 at Helmcken Falls).

WI11 – Wolverine (first W11 climbed by Tim Emmett and Klemen Premrl in 2011 at Helmcken Falls).

WI12 – Interstellar Spice (first W12 climbed by Tim Emmett and Klemen Premrl in 2016 at Helmcken Falls).

WI13 – Misson to Mars (first W13 climbed Tim Emmett and Klemen Premrl in 2020 at Helmcken Falls).

Mixed ice grading
Mixed climbing has its own grading scale that roughly follows the WI rating system with respect to its physical and technical demands. Typically starts at M4. Subgrades of "−" and "+" are commonly used, although the distinctions are typically very subjective.

References

External links 

International Mountaineering and Climbing Federation (UIAA)
Ice Climbing Techniques and Skills

 
Types of climbing
Mountaineering techniques
Articles containing video clips
Ice sports